Topsfield is a town in Washington County, Maine, United States. The population was 179 at the 2020 census.

Geography

Climate
This climatic region is typified by large seasonal temperature differences, with warm to hot (and often humid) summers and cold (sometimes severely cold) winters.  According to the Köppen Climate Classification system, Topsfield has a humid continental climate, abbreviated "Dfb" on climate maps.

Demographics

2010 census
As of the census of 2010, there were 237 people, 95 households, and 74 families living in the town. The racial makeup of the town was 99.2% White, 0.4% Native American, and 0.4% from other races.

There were 95 households, of which 28.4% had children under the age of 18 living with them, 65.3% were married couples living together, 6.3% had a female householder with no husband present, 6.3% had a male householder with no wife present, and 22.1% were non-families. 20.0% of all households were made up of individuals, and 6.3% had someone living alone who was 65 years of age or older. The average household size was 2.49 and the average family size was 2.81.

The median age in the town was 49.3 years. 21.1% of residents were under the age of 18; 4.3% were between the ages of 18 and 24; 19.9% were from 25 to 44; 36.6% were from 45 to 64; and 18.1% were 65 years of age or older. The gender makeup of the town was 53.6% male and 46.4% female.

2000 census
As of the census of 2000, there were 225 people, 92 households, and 65 families living in the town.  The population density was 4.4 people per square mile (1.7/km).  There were 175 housing units at an average density of 3.5 per square mile (1.3/km).  The racial makeup of the town was 98.22% White and 1.78% Native American.

There were 92 households, out of which 32.6% had children under the age of 18 living with them, 64.1% were married couples living together, 4.3% had a female householder with no husband present, and 28.3% were non-families. 25.0% of all households were made up of individuals, and 17.4% had someone living alone who was 65 years of age or older.  The average household size was 2.45 and the average family size was 2.89.

In the town, the population was spread out, with 25.3% under the age of 18, 5.8% from 18 to 24, 25.8% from 25 to 44, 28.4% from 45 to 64, and 14.7% who were 65 years of age or older.  The median age was 41 years. For every 100 females, there were 94.0 males.  For every 100 females age 18 and over, there were 90.9 males.

The median income for a household in the town was $26,250, and the median income for a family was $31,875. Males had a median income of $30,833 versus $13,929 for females. The per capita income for the town was $14,456.  About 10.4% of families and 13.5% of the population were below the poverty line, including 16.0% of those under the age of eighteen and 20.5% of those 65 or over.

References

External links
 

Towns in Washington County, Maine
Towns in Maine